Parapercis rufa, the red sandperch, is a fish species in the sandperch family, Pinguipedidae. It is found in the Philippines. This species reaches an unknown length.

References

Pinguipedidae
Taxa named by John Ernest Randall
Fish described in 2001